Sir John Beith  (4 April 1914 – 4 September 2000) was a British diplomat, ambassador to Israel and Belgium.

Career
John Greville Stanley Beith was educated at Eton College and King's College, Cambridge. He entered the Diplomatic Service in 1937 and served at the Foreign Office until 1940 when he was posted to Athens. When the German army approached Athens in April 1941 the British Embassy was evacuated and Beith spent the rest of the war in Buenos Aires. He returned to the Foreign Office 1945–49 and was then Head of the UK Permanent Delegation to the United Nations at Geneva 1950–53, Head of Chancery at Prague 1953–54 and Head of Chancery at Paris 1954–59. He returned to the Foreign Office again as head of the Levant department 1959–61 and head of the North and East Africa department 1961–63. He was Ambassador to Israel 1963–65, assistant Secretary-General of NATO 1966–67 and Assistant Under-Secretary of State at the Foreign Office 1967–69, during which he led the British delegation in talks on the future of Gibraltar, which ended with the 1967 Gibraltar sovereignty referendum. Beith's final diplomatic post was as Ambassador to Belgium, 1969–74.

John Beith was appointed CMG in the New Year Honours of 1959 and knighted KCMG in the Queen's Birthday Honours of 1969.

Few postwar British diplomats had a greater gift for making friends in the countries to which they were accredited, or for solving knotty problems over a drink or meal, than Sir John Beith ... Foreigners rightly considered him a man of utmost probity, who saw both sides of a question and with whom it was a pleasure to do business. 
— Obituary, The Guardian, London, 13 September 2000

Family
In 1949 John Beith married Diana Gregory-Hood, daughter of Sir John Gilmour, 2nd Baronet. Her father's sister, Mary Gilmour, had married Hughe Knatchbull-Hugessen who was ambassador to Belgium 1944–47.

References
MUIRHEAD, Sir David (Francis), Who Was Who, A & C Black, 1920–2008; online edn, Oxford University Press, Dec 2007, retrieved 8 June 2012
Sir John Beith: Cultured diplomat who represented Britain in Belgium and Israel, The Times, 13 September 2000, page 21
Sir John Beith, The Guardian, London, 13 September 2000
Obituary: Sir John Beith, The Telegraph, London, 6 September 2000

1914 births
2000 deaths
People educated at Eton College
Alumni of King's College, Cambridge
Ambassadors of the United Kingdom to Israel
Ambassadors of the United Kingdom to Belgium
Knights Commander of the Order of St Michael and St George